Seraj Park, , is a northern suburb of Shahdara, Lahore, Punjab, Pakistan. It is situated on the northern side of the Ravi River.

Seraj Park can be translated as (Duban Pura) and also known as "Lamp Garden". Seraj translates as "Lamp" and Park translates as Garden. In the 15th century, Seraj Park was the Neighborhood of Shahdara Lahore under the Mughal Empire. It hosts several historic Passageway sites.  These near areas include the Akbari Sarai, the Tomb of Jahangir (who was the Emperor from 1605 to 1627), the tomb of his consort Noor Jahan, as well as the tomb of his brother-in-law Asif Khan. Seraj Park is also home to Imran Ki Baradari (Imran Ki Baradari).  Although this site was originally built on the Ravi River bank, the river changed course, covering the site near the Ravi Bridge.
The small garden houses the tomb of Mughal Princess Dohita Un Nissa Begum (1651-1697). The daughter of Dara Shikoh is also buried here in another tomb.

Seraj Park's nearest places.

Shahdara Bagh Railway Station and Shahdara Town Railway Station

Qazi Park 0.4 km
Larex Colony 0.5 km
Government High School Shahdara 0.7 km
Shahdara Bagh 0.8 km
Noor Jahan Tomb 0.9 km
LDA Sports Ground Shahdra Town 1.5 km
Memood Colony 2.5 km
Yousaf Park 2.7 km
Imamia Colony 3 km
Peoples Colony 3.1 km.

Gallery

See also 
 List of parks and gardens in Lahore
 List of parks and gardens in Pakistan
 List of parks and gardens in Karachi
Tomb of Asif Khan
Tomb of Jahangir
Tomb of Muhammad Iqbal
Tomb of Nur Jahan

References

Mughal gardens in Pakistan
Populated places in Lahore District